Colonel Michael Peter Feltham Jones CBE DSO (19 October 1919 - 11 April 2015) was a British Army officer of the Brigade of Gurkhas who was awarded an Immediate DSO at the Battle of Enfidaville in Tunisia, 1943.

References

External links 
http://www.iwm.org.uk/collections/item/object/80020369
http://discovery.nationalarchives.gov.uk/details/r/D7361746

1919 births
2015 deaths
British Indian Army officers
Royal Gurkha Rifles officers
Indian Army personnel of World War II
Commanders of the Order of the British Empire
Companions of the Distinguished Service Order